Souleymane Keïta (born 24 November 1986) is a Malian former professional footballer who played as a midfielder.

Career
Born in Bamako, Keïta started his career in Mali with local side Djoliba AC. After just one season with the senior team, he joined Emirati club Al-Jazira, where he stayed for just one season before leaving the club. In the summer of 2005 he joined Algerian club ES Sétif and instantly had an impact. In his first season, he was a main stay in the team starting line-up and helped the team finish fourth in the standings and earn a spot in next year's edition of the Arab Champions League. The 2006–07 season would be his most successful to date, helping ES Sétif win the Algerian League and the Arab Champions League.

Transfer dispute
After winning the 2007 Arab Champions League, he signed a contract with Qatari club Al-Arabi. However, just days later, he signed another contract with Ligue 2 side AC Ajaccio and chose to join them instead. After playing four games for AC Ajaccio, Al-Arabi pleaded their case to FIFA to regain the player and FIFA ruled in their favour, forcing the player to join Al-Arabi.

Sivasspor
On 27 December 2009, the 23-year-old midfielder left Al-Kharitiyath to join Süper Lig side Sivasspor on a two-year contract.

Honours
ES Sétif
 Arab Champions League: 2007
 Algerian League: 2007

Mali
Africa Cup of Nations bronze: 2012

References

External links

Sportspeople from Bamako
Malian footballers
Malian expatriate footballers
AC Ajaccio players
1986 births
Living people
Association football midfielders
Expatriate footballers in Qatar
Expatriate footballers in Algeria
Expatriate footballers in Turkey
Expatriate soccer players in South Africa
Malian expatriate sportspeople in Algeria
ES Sétif players
Djoliba AC players
Al Jazira Club players
Al-Arabi SC (Qatar) players
Al Kharaitiyat SC players
Lamontville Golden Arrows F.C. players
Sivasspor footballers
Ligue 2 players
Süper Lig players
Qatar Stars League players
2012 Africa Cup of Nations players
UAE Pro League players
Mali international footballers
21st-century Malian people